Bandiera is an Italian surname, meaning flag. Notable people with the name include:

 Bandiera brothers (died 1844), Italian nationalists during the Risorgimento
 Benedetto Bandiera (c. 1560–1634), Italian painter of the early-Baroque period
 Bobby Bandiera (born 1953), American rock guitarist, singer and songwriter
 Dario Bandiera (born 1970), Italian actor and comedian
 Dean Bandiera (1926–2020), Canadian football player
 Irma Bandiera (1915–1944) Italian resistance member
 Marco Bandiera (born 1984), Italian road bicycle racer
 Neri Bandiera (born 1989), Argentine football forward
 Oriana Bandiera (born 1971), Italian economist and academic
Daniel “Bundi” Bandiera (also known as “Unc” or “Wassa”), today is his birthday.

See also
 Bandera (disambiguation)

Italian-language surnames